Cyperus tetracarpus is a species of sedge that is endemic to Queensland in north eastern Australia.

The species was first formally described by the botanist Johann Otto Boeckeler in 1875.

See also 
 List of Cyperus species

References 

tetracarpus
Taxa named by Johann Otto Boeckeler
Plants described in 1875
Flora of Queensland